Pachyarmatherium is a genus of extinct large armadillo-like cingulates found in North and South America from the Pliocene and Pleistocene epochs, related to the extant armadillos and the extinct pampatheres and glyptodonts.

Taxonomy  
Pachyarmatherium was named by Downing and White (1995). Its type is P. leiseyi.
It was assigned to Dasypodoidea by Downing and White (1995), and tentatively to Glyptodontidae by McKenna and Bell (1997). A cladistic analysis performed by de O. Porpino et al. (2009) led to the conclusion that Pachyarmatherium is a sister group to a clade consisting of Glyptodontidae and Pampatheriidae. Oliveira et al. (2013) suggest that Pachyarmatherium is a possible dasypodid.

Fossil distribution of Pachyarmatherium

P. leiseyi 
 Kissimmee River site, Tamiami Formation, Okeechobee County, Florida ~4.9—1.8 Mya.
 Haile 16A Site, Alachua County, Florida ~1.8 Mya.—300,000 years ago.
 Payne Creek Mine, Polk County, Florida ~1.8 Mya—300,000 years ago.
 Leisey Shell Pit 1A, Bermont Formation, Hillsborough County, Florida ~1.8—300,000 years ago.

P. tenebris 
 Zumbador Cave (= Cueva del Zumbador) - Capadare Formation, Falcón, Venezuela, Pleistocene
 Cueva El Miedo (= Cave Fear), Capadare Formation, Lujanian, Falcón, Venezuela, ~800,000-11,000 BP

P. brasiliense 
Lajedo de Escada, Rio Grande do Norte, Brazil, Late Pleistocene, 100,000 years BP

References

Further reading 
 

Prehistoric cingulates
Prehistoric placental genera
Pliocene xenarthrans
Pleistocene xenarthrans
Pleistocene extinctions
Pliocene mammals of North America
Pleistocene mammals of North America
Blancan
Pleistocene mammals of South America
Lujanian
Pleistocene Brazil
Fossils of Brazil
Pleistocene Venezuela
Fossils of Venezuela
Fossil taxa described in 1995